The Whanaki River is a river of the Auckland Region of New Zealand's North Island. It flows southwest from its origins near Wellsford to reach the Tauhoa River, an arm of the Kaipara Harbour.

See also
List of rivers of New Zealand

References

Hibiscus and Bays Local Board Area
Rivers of the Auckland Region
Kaipara Harbour catchment